Club de Fútbol Rusadir is a Spanish football club based in the autonomous city of Melilla. Founded in 2001, it plays in Primera Autonómica de Melilla, holding home games at Estadio La Espiguera, which has a capacity of 2,000 spectators.

Season to season

1 season in Tercera División

References

External links
BDFutbol team profile
Soccerway team profile

Football clubs in Melilla
Association football clubs established in 2001
2001 establishments in Spain